Acer sutchuenense is an Asian species of maple. It is native to China (Hubei, Hunan, + Sichuan).

Acer sutchuenense is a deciduous tree up to 12 meters tall with smooth gray bark. Leaves are compound with 3 leaflets, each leaflet up to 15 cm wide and 6 cm across, thin and papery, with a few shallow teeth along the edges.

References

External links
line drawing for Flora of China drawings 3–5 at bottom

sutchuenense
Plants described in 1894
Flora of China